Gerald Alvin "Jerry" Lewis (March 31, 1934 – January 25, 2022) was an American attorney and politician served in the Florida House of Representatives and was the 26th comptroller of the State of Florida, serving from January 7, 1975 to January 3, 1995.

Born in 1934 in Birmingham, Alabama to Bernard and Molly Lewis, Gerald Lewis was educated in Birmingham schools before attending Harvard College and graduating with an A.B. degree in 1955. He then spent the next two years on active duty as a paratrooper with the United States Army, attaining the rank of captain.

Lewis moved to Florida in 1960. Prior to moving, he returned to Harvard to obtain a LL.B degree. He was elected to the Florida House of Representatives in 1965 for Dade County, Florida and served until 1970. He later served as the state comptroller under governors Reubin Askew, Bob Graham, Bob Martinez, and Lawton Chiles.

Lewis was married to national Democratic Party political strategist Ann Lewis until their 1968 divorce.

Lewis died on January 25, 2022, aged 87.

References

Living people
1934 births
Jewish American military personnel
Florida Comptrollers
Members of the Florida House of Representatives
Harvard College alumni
Harvard Law School alumni
21st-century American Jews